Hájske is a village and municipality in Šaľa District, in the Nitra Region of southwest Slovakia.

History
In historical records the village was first mentioned in 1113.

Geography
The village lies at an altitude of 130 metres and covers an area of 14.066 km2. It has a population of about 1,365 people.

Ethnicity
The village is about 97% Slovak.

Facilities
The village has a public library and a football pitch.

Hajske also has the distinction of being the home of cricket in Slovakia. The club attracts players from the village itself as well as from the expatriate community in Bratislava. The club has its own website at   where contact details and history are found.

See also
 List of municipalities and towns in Slovakia

References

External links
Official homepage
Surnames of living people in Hajske

Villages and municipalities in Šaľa District